"The Brave Tin Soldier" is a 1934 animated short film directed by Ub Iwerks and part of the ComiColor cartoon series.

The film is also known as "Christmas in a Junkyard".

Plot summary 
A toymaker creates tin soldiers. He drops one of the on the floor, accidentally breaks one of his legs off and throws him into the waste. The toymaker goes to bed and at midnight a soldier blows a bugle call and all toys come to life: Dolls, a jack-in-the-box, roly-poly Laurel and Hardy dolls, marionettes, a model railway. The discarded soldier climbs up from the waste basked and realizes he only has one leg, and other toys taunt him. A ballerina expresses her sympathies for him and he is infatuated with her.

Two guards outside a castle blows another bugle call and a parade of soldiers exits the gate, followed by a trolley carrying the king. The soldier pushes the ballerina on a swing, but the king, who also takes a liking to the ballerina, tells the soldier to scram. The king makes unwelcome advances to the ballerina and the soldier, from a distance, loads his rifle with a match, lighting a firework piece which hits the king in the bottom.

A trial is arranged. The ballerina begs for the soldier's life, but the soldier is sentenced to death. At the execution, the soldier refuses a blindfold, and the ballerina again begs for his life. When she is not heard, she runs to the soldier to embrace him. Shots from the firing squad pushes the couple into the fireplace and they melt into one heart, and taps is played.

Smoke from the soldier and the ballerina, in the shape of a heart, rises through the chimney and into the night sky. At the pearly gates of toy heaven, a toy Saint Peter awaits with the Keys of Heaven at his side and a halo above his head. The soldiers missing leg grows back, the gates open, and all three enter.

Image gallery

References

External links 
 
 

1934 animated films
1934 short films
American animated short films
1930s American animated films
Films directed by Ub Iwerks
ComiColor cartoons